Seremaia Baïkeinuku (born 4 January 1979) is a retired Fijian rugby union player who played most recently for Leicester Tigers in the Aviva Premiership, and represented Fiji at a National level. He plays at both Fly-half and Inside Centre.

Career
Seremaia Bai finished his career playing for Leicester Tigers after joining them in 2014. He previously played for Castres Olympique and ASM Clermont Auvergne who both compete in France's Top 14 competition. He also plays for the Fiji national team and the Pacific Islanders. He has played under-19s, under 21s and under 23s for the Fiji national side. Bai attended Lelean Memorial School in Nausori, Fiji.

He made his international debut for Fiji in 2000 in a match against Japan which Fiji won 47–22. That year he was also capped against Samoa, the USA, Canada and Italy. In 2001 he was capped three times, twice against Tonga and once against Samoa. In the second match against Tonga he broke his ankle. In 2002 he joined Southland for the National Provincial Championship, and went on tour with Fiji for the November Test series in the northern hemisphere.

 He was not included in Fiji's squad for the 2003 Rugby World Cup in Australia, but returned in 2004 for Fiji in two matches in June, against Tonga and Samoa. He was included in the combined Pacific Islanders team that toured the southern nations. He also played numerous international matches the following season. In 2006 he captained the Tailevu Knights for the 2006 Colonial Cup, and then signed with Clermont Auvergne in France. He played for Fiji in the Pacific Nations Cup, and was then selected for the 2006 Pacific Islanders squad for the tour of Europe. He went on to play a substantial part of Fiji's quarter-final reaching team at the 2007 Rugby World Cup. In 2008 he was selected to play for the Pacific Islanders in what would be their final tour. In 2009 he was announced as the Fiji captain for their European tour. In 2010 he signed to play for Castres Olympique on a two-year contract. He also competed at the 2011 Rugby World Cup.

His younger brother Setareki Koroilagilagi also has played for the Fiji, and they first played alongside each other in June 2013 against the USA.

In April 2014, he signed a contract with Leicester Tigers.

Seremaia announced his retirement from professional Rugby effective at the end of the 2015/2016 season, with the aim to focus on his BAI (Be An Inspiration) programme, encouraging youngsters into Rugby in his native Fiji

Honours

Club 
 Castres
Top 14: 2012–13

References

External links
Leicester Tigers Profile

Living people
1979 births
People educated at Lelean Memorial School
ASM Clermont Auvergne players
Fijian rugby union players
Rugby union centres
Rugby union fly-halves
Fiji international rugby union players
Pacific Islanders rugby union players
Fijian expatriate rugby union players
Expatriate rugby union players in New Zealand
Expatriate rugby union players in Australia
Expatriate rugby union players in Wales
Expatriate rugby union players in Japan
Expatriate rugby union players in France
Fijian expatriate sportspeople in New Zealand
Fijian expatriate sportspeople in Australia
Fijian expatriate sportspeople in England
Fijian expatriate sportspeople in Japan
Fijian expatriate sportspeople in France
People from Nausori
I-Taukei Fijian people
Leicester Tigers players
Fijian expatriate sportspeople in Wales
Fiji women's national rugby union team coaches